Ian Kyle Conyers (born October 28, 1988) is an American politician who represented the 4th District of Michigan in the Michigan Senate for one term. He is a member of the Democratic Party.

Conyers sat on the Economic Development & International Investment, Energy & Technology, and Banking & Financial Services Committees in the State Senate. He was minority vice chair of the Transportation Committee.

Early life and education 
Conyers was born in 1988 and raised in Detroit, Michigan. His father's family has lived there since his great-grandfather, John Conyers Sr. moved there from rural Georgia as part of the Great Migration. His grandfather, William Conyers, was the younger brother of Congressman John Conyers Jr., who retired in 2017 after setting a record for longevity in Congress.

Ian Conyers attended University of Detroit Jesuit High School. He graduated from Georgetown University, where he obtained a B.A. in government. While at Georgetown, Conyers played football and joined the Kappa Chi chapter of Kappa Alpha Psi fraternity. Conyers also earned a Master's degree in urban and regional planning from Georgetown. While in Washington, DC, he worked on the Anacostia waterfront redevelopment, a multi-year, public-private effort.

Political career

2016 election
On January 27, 2016, Conyers filed to run in the Democratic Party primary election for Michigan's 3rd State House District.

On April 13, 2016, Conyers filed to run in the Democratic primary election to fill the remainder of the term for the vacancy in Michigan's 4th State Senate District. Candidates were running to replace Virgil Smith Jr., who had resigned from office amid a domestic violence scandal. In the primary, Conyers won a nine-candidate race with 34.52% of the vote. In the General Election, Conyers defeated Republican Keith Franklin with 76.55% of the vote. He entered office in November 2016 for the remainder of the term; at 28 years of age, he was the youngest state senator in Michigan's history to that date.

Conyers was assigned to the Economic Development & International Investment, Energy & Technology, and Banking & Financial Services committees in the State Senate. He served as minority vice chair of the Transportation Committee. His term ended December 31, 2018.

2018 Congressional special election
In late 2017 his great-uncle, Congressman John Conyers Jr., was the subject of several allegations of sexual harassment by former staffers. In November, the House Ethics Committee initiated an investigation into the allegations.
 
John Conyers Jr. scheduled an announcement about his plans on the "Mildred Gaddis Show". But before he appeared, his great-nephew pre-empted him with an interview published that day with the New York Times and ABC News. Ian Conyers said about his great-uncle: “He is not resigning. He is going to retire. His doctor advised him that the rigor of another campaign would be too much for him just in terms of his health.” Conyers also said that his great-uncle encouraged him to run for the seat and that he would be running for the position.

Later that day, John Conyers Jr. announced his immediate retirement. He endorsed his eldest son, 27-year-old John Conyers III, to succeed him in Congress. John Conyers III said that he did not seek his father’s endorsement and had not decided whether to run for public office. He did not collect enough petition signatures to make the ballot.

Ian Conyers urged the local and national media to take “a thorough look at all candidates” vying to replace his great-uncle. He later took down those tweets. After Republican Governor Rick Snyder held the seat vacant for over one year the election was announced as a double primary in which one contest was to finish the unexpired term of John Conyers Jr. and a second concurrent election was to hold the office from 2018 until 2020. Detroit city council president Brenda Jones won the partial election, Rashida Tlaib narrowly won the full term by 800 votes.

On January 19, 2018, Ian Conyers formally announced his candidacy for the 13th Congressional District vacancy.

References

External links

1988 births
African-American state legislators in Michigan
Georgetown College (Georgetown University) alumni
Living people
Democratic Party Michigan state senators
Politicians from Detroit
21st-century African-American people
20th-century African-American people